The 1965 WCHA Men's Ice Hockey Tournament was the 6th conference playoff in league history. The tournament was played between March 5 and March 13, 1965. All games were played at home team campus sites. By reaching the title game both Michigan Tech and North Dakota were invited to participate in the 1965 NCAA University Division Men's Ice Hockey Tournament.

This was the final season that the WCHA named a single tournament champion until 1977.

Format
The top four teams in the WCHA, based upon the conference regular season standings, were eligible for the tournament and were seeded No. 1 through No. 4. In the first round the first and fourth seeds and the second and third seeds were matched in two-game series where the school that scored the higher number of goals was declared the winner. The winners advanced to the title game which was to be played at the higher remaining seed's home venue.

Conference standings
Note: GP = Games played; W = Wins; L = Losses; T = Ties; PCT = Winning percentage; GF = Goals for; GA = Goals against

Bracket

Note: * denotes overtime period(s)

First round

(1) North Dakota vs. (4) Michigan State

(2) Michigan Tech vs. (3) Minnesota

Final

(1) North Dakota vs. (2) Michigan Tech

Tournament awards
None

See also
Western Collegiate Hockey Association men's champions

References

External links
WCHA.com
1964–65 WCHA Standings
1964–65 NCAA Standings
2013–14 Michigan State Spartans Media Guide; Section 5
2013–14 Minnesota Golden Gophers Media Guide 
2013–14 North Dakota Hockey Media Guide

WCHA Men's Ice Hockey Tournament
Wcha Men's Ice Hockey Tournament